Esmeralda was a Portuguese carrack that sank in May 1503 off the coast of Oman as part of Vasco da Gama's 1502 Armada to India while commanded by da Gama's maternal uncle Vicente Sodré. First relocated in 1998 and excavated by David Mearns in 2013–15, is the earliest ship found, from Europe’s Age of Discovery.

Items recovered from the wreck site include the earliest known mariner's astrolabe believed to have been made between 1496 and 1501 and a ship's bell dated 1498.

References

Shipwrecks in the Arabian Sea
1503 in the Portuguese Empire
Ships of Portugal
Carracks